Gyascutus planicosta is a species of metallic wood-boring beetle in the family Buprestidae. It is found in Central America and North America.

Subspecies
These three subspecies belong to the species Gyascutus planicosta:
 Gyascutus planicosta cribriceps Casey, 1909
 Gyascutus planicosta obliteratus (LeConte, 1858)
 Gyascutus planicosta planicosta (LeConte, 1858)

References

Further reading

External links

 

Buprestidae
Articles created by Qbugbot
Beetles described in 1858